The Cor de la Generalitat Valenciana (CGV), founded as Cor de Valencia in 1987, is the main local-government funded choir in Valencia.

Selected discography
 2013 Verdi baritone arias (Plácido Domingo album)

References

Valencia
Spanish choirs